The Goslings were an American drone rock and noise rock band from Florida, United States, with releases on labels such as Not Not Fun Records, Crucial Blast Records, and Archive Recordings. The core members of the band are Leslie Soren (vocals) and Max Soren (guitar) with a rotating roster of drummers which have included Brendan Grubb, Adel Souto, Rick Smith (also of Torche), Paul Leroy and Steve Carrera. The Goslings' sound is often characterized as "lo-fi," noisy, and heavy but also beautiful and psychedelic. The group self-records all of their own albums on cassette tape or reel-to-reel tape, are somewhat reclusive and do not tour. They have had a number of releases since forming in 2002 but their signature album to date is considered to be Grandeur of Hair (released on Archive Recordings, 2006 and re-pressed in 2009).

Discography

Albums
Sister and Son / Death Garage, Rotting Chapel, 2010 (double cassette);
Heaven of Animals re-issue, [Archive Recordings], 2009;
Occasion, [Not Not Fun Records], 2008;
Grandeur of Hair [Archive Recordings], 2006;
Spaceheater / Perfect Interior Re-issue CD [Crucial Blast Records], 2006;
Between the Dead, Self-Released, 2005;
Heaven of Animals, XDEY Records, 2005

EPs
Spaceheater EP, Asaurus Records, 2004;
Perfect Interior EP, Asaurus Records, 2003.

Others
"Split 7" w/ Yellow Swans, [Not Not Fun Records], 2007;Folklore of the Moon 3" CDR, [Hand/Eye], 2005;

Compilation appearancesYou Already Have Too Many CDRS, Asaurus Records, 2005 - 3 Disc Label Comp. (contributed three tracks: "Untitled", "Compass Rose", "Knocking On Heavens Door")For Whom The Casio Tolls, Asaurus Records, 2004 - Label Comp. (contributed one track: "Panopticon")Watermelons Should Last Forever, Asaurus Records, 2003 - Label comp. (contributed one track: "Herons")Finally Something to Replace Bowling, Asaurus Records, 2002 - Label comp. (contributed one track: "Green Figurine")Il Programma Di Religione, Boyarm, 2005 - Label comp. (contributed one track: "Gregory XVI (1831-1846)") Songs for the End of the World, 2002 - Label comp. (contributed one track: "CMBR") 

Side projectsGorgon EP, Tin Cans and Twine, 2005Oleta EP'', Tin Cans and Twine, 2004 (feat. Max Soren)

References

External links 
Not Not Fun Records
Crucial Blast Records
Archive Recordings
The Goslings' Official Website

American noise rock music groups
Drone music groups
Rock music groups from Florida